This is a list of notable hotels in Germany.

Hotels in Germany

 Atlantis House
 Breidenbacher Hof, Düsseldorf
 Canis Resort, Freising
 Cecilienhof, Potsdam
 Dom-Hotel, Cologne
 Edelweiss Lodge and Resort, Garmisch-Partenkirchen
 Edelweiss Vacation Village and Campground
 Eh'häusl
 Excelsior Hotel Ernst, Cologne
 General Walker Hotel, Obersalzberg (defunct)
 Grand Hotel Heiligendamm, Heiligendamm
 Gut Weißenhaus
 Hotel Atlantic Kempinski, Hamburg
 Hotel Nassauer Hof
 Hotel Nikko Düsseldorf, Düsseldorf
 Hotel Petersberg, Near Bonn
 Hotel Vier Jahreszeiten Kempinski
 Hotel Waldkater
 Kempinski Hotel Falkenstein
 Meisdorf House, Meisdorf
 Palasthotel (defunct)
 Propeller Island City Lodge
 Prora (defunct)
 Radisson Blu Hotel, Hamburg
 Ringberghaus, Suhl
 Schloss Elmau
 Schloss Wolfsbrunn
 Schlosshotel Kronberg, Kronberg im Taunus
 St Petrus House
 Staffelter Hof
 Steigenberger Parkhotel Düsseldorf, Düsseldorf
 Taschenbergpalais, Dresden
 Zum Roten Bären, Freiburg
 Zum Schwan

Hotels in Berlin

 Estrel Hotel
 Grand Hotel Bellevue (defunct)
 Hotel Adlon
 Hotel Bellevue
 Hotel Berlin
 Hotel Berolina (defunct)
 Hotel Bristol (defunct)
 Hotel Esplanade (defunct)
 Hotel Excelsior (defunct)
 Hotel Fürstenhof (defunct)
 Hotel Kaiserhof (defunct)
 Miniloft 
 Nhow Berlin
 Park Inn Berlin 
 Propeller Island City Lodge
 Swissôtel Berlin
 Zoofenster

Hotels in Munich

 The Charles Hotel
 Hilton Munich Airport
 Hotel Bayerischer Hof
 Hotel Königshof
 Hotel Vier Jahreszeiten Kempinski
 Kempinski Hotel Airport Munich
 Kempinski Hotel Falkenstein
 Mandarin Oriental

See also
 Lists of hotels – an index of hotel list articles on Wikipedia

References

External links
 

!
Tourism in Germany
Germany
Hotels